Uniform Codes are codes of practice developed and maintained by the International Association of Plumbing and Mechanical Officials (IAPMO) using the American National Standards Institute's (ANSI) accredited consensus development process working on a three-year cycle. This process brings together volunteers representing a variety of viewpoints and interests to achieve consensus.

Uniform codes
The Uniform Codes are used to meet the specific needs of individual jurisdictions both in the United States and abroad. The Uniform family of codes consists of:

 Uniform Plumbing Code
 Uniform Mechanical Code
 Uniform Solar Energy and Hydronics Code
 Uniform Swimming Pool, Spa and Hot Tub Code

See also
 IAPMO
 IAPMO R&T
 IAPMO Standards
 Uniform Plumbing Code
 Uniform Mechanical Code
 Uniform Solar Energy and Hydronics Code
 Uniform Swimming Pool, Spa and Hot Tub Code

References

External links
 IAPMO Website
 IAPMO Codes Website
 Uniform Plumbing Code Website
 Uniform Mechanical Code Website

Plumbing
Safety codes
Heating, ventilation, and air conditioning